Badia is a rural commune in the Cercle of Kita in the Kayes Region of south-western Mali. The principal village is Daféla. In the 2009 census the commune had a population of 7,514.

References

External links
.

Communes of Kayes Region